Two-Fisted Mama! is an album by the American musician Katie Webster, released in 1989. Webster promoted the album with a North American tour. The album was nominated for a Bammy Award, in the "Blues Album" category.

Production
The album was produced by Webster, Bruce Iglauer, Vasti Jackson, and Ice Cube Slim. The Memphis Horns guested on Two-Fisted Mama! Webster wrote or cowrote six of the album's songs; "So Far Away" is a cover of the Dire Straits song. "Red Negligee" is done in a talking blues style. Many songs address women listeners by providing relationship advice.

Critical reception

Robert Christgau wrote: "Boogie as in woogie, not as in bar band, is her gift—a rolling piano style she certainly didn't invent and just as certainly owns—and here the experts get it down." Newsday noted that, "like most great blues artists, she uses the irregular, the unexpected, to make musical points; where others might use a melisma, she sings the phrase straight and sweet; she purrs where others would growl, and vice versa."

The Chicago Tribune wrote that Webster delivers "some comic relief with sharp and funny tales of the war between the sexes." The Edmonton Journal called Two-Fisted Mama! "one of the most rewarding blues albums of the year," writing that "Webster is a superb, soulful singer and an immense piano player." The Syracuse Herald-Journal praised Webster's "bawdy, quick-paced style."

AllMusic deemed the album "another impressive showcase for Katie Webster's rollicking 88s and earthy vocals."

Track listing

References

1989 albums
Alligator Records albums